Trichothyse is a genus of African ground spiders that was first described by R. W. E. Tucker in 1923.

Species
 it contains four species:
Trichothyse africana (Tucker, 1923) – South Africa
Trichothyse fontensis Lawrence, 1928 – Namibia
Trichothyse hortensis Tucker, 1923 (type) – South Africa
Trichothyse subtropica Lawrence, 1927 – Namibia

References

Araneomorphae genera
Gnaphosidae
Spiders of Africa